The following lists events that happened during 1882 in New Zealand.

One of New Zealand's major industries – export meat – is initiated when the shipping of frozen meat to Britain proves successful.

Incumbents

Regal and viceregal
Head of State – Queen Victoria
Governor – The term of The Hon. Sir Arthur Hamilton-Gordon ends on 24 June. His replacement does not take up his appointment until the following year. (see 1883)

Government and law
The 8th New Zealand Parliament continues.

Speaker of the House – Maurice O'Rorke.
Premier – John Hall resigns on 21 April. He is replaced by Frederick Whitaker who becomes Premier for the second time.
Minister of Finance – Harry Atkinson
Chief Justice – Hon Sir James Prendergast

Main centre leaders
Mayor of Auckland – James Clark
Mayor of Christchurch – James Gapes followed by George Ruddenklau
Mayor of Dunedin – James Gore followed by James Bryce Thomson
Mayor of Wellington – George Fisher

Events 
 15 February: The Dunedin departs from Port Chalmers carrying the first shipment of frozen meat bound for Britain. 
 26 April – A telephone exchange is opened in Dunedin (the third in New Zealand).

Sport

Cricket
 1882–83 New Zealand cricket season

Horse racing
New Zealand Cup winner: Welcome Jack
New Zealand Derby winner: Cheviot
Auckland Cup winner: Welcome Jack
Wellington Cup winner: Hilda

see also :Category:Horse races in New Zealand.

Rugby union
The first overseas rugby team visits New Zealand. The Southern Rugby Union from New South Wales wins four of its seven matches. (see also 1884)

Provincial club rugby champions include: 
see also :Category:Rugby union in New Zealand

Shooting
Ballinger Belt: Corporal Hutchison (Dunedin)

Births
 2 January: Jessie Isabel Hetherington, headmistress, lecturer and school inspector
 27 February: A. N. Field, white supremacist
 1 June: Jim Thorn, labour leader and politician  
 24 June: Jim Barclay, politician
 16 September (in Australia): Freda du Faur, mountaineer.

Unknown date
 Bernard Martin, politician

Deaths
 1 April: James Kelham, politician.
 2 October: Francis Gledhill, politician (born 1803). 
 (in England, unknown date) James O'Neill, politician (born 1819).

See also
List of years in New Zealand
Timeline of New Zealand history
History of New Zealand
Military history of New Zealand
Timeline of the New Zealand environment
Timeline of New Zealand's links with Antarctica

References
General
 Romanos, J. (2001) New Zealand Sporting Records and Lists. Auckland: Hodder Moa Beckett. 
Specific

External links